Laura Angélica Rojas Hernández (born 26 December 1975) is a Mexican politician affiliated with the PAN.

She served as congresswoman of the LXIV Legislature of the Mexican Congress, she was also the President of the Chamber of Deputies (equivalent to the Speaker of the House in other countries). She also served as congresswoman during the LX Legislature and as a Senator from 2012 to 2018. During her tenure as Senator, she was the Chairwoman of the Foreign Affairs Committee.

Laura Rojas was elected President of the Chamber of Deputies on September 5, 2019. This was the fourth vote over a period of three days, with 349 votes in favor, 42 against, and 37 absent.

References

1975 births
Living people
Politicians from Mexico City
Women members of the Senate of the Republic (Mexico)
Members of the Senate of the Republic (Mexico)
Presidents of the Chamber of Deputies (Mexico)
National Action Party (Mexico) politicians
21st-century Mexican politicians
21st-century Mexican women politicians
Women members of the Chamber of Deputies (Mexico)
Women legislative speakers
Deputies of the LXIV Legislature of Mexico
Members of the Chamber of Deputies (Mexico) for the State of Mexico
Senators of the LXII and LXIII Legislatures of Mexico
Deputies of the LX Legislature of Mexico